Jean Ferris (January 24, 1939 – October 30, 2015) was an American writer best known for young adult fiction. She lived in San Diego, California, with her husband, a retired lawyer.

Biography
Ferris was born in Fort Leavenworth, Kansas. She started to write at seven years old, keeping a diary. She moved around frequently, attending three high schools and  Stanford University, for a B.A. and an M.A. in speech pathology and audiology. Ferris wrote her first novel for young adults (Amen, Moses Gardenia, published in 1983) when one of her children's 14-year-old friends tried to commit suicide. Since then she tried writing screenplays, adult mystery, adult historical novels, and middle-grade novels, but nothing suited her as well as writing for teens.  Her two daughters are teachers. Ferris' hobbies and interests included traveling, reading, long walks with friends, movies, theater, and reading books onto tape for the Braille Institute.

Awards
Awards include: American Library Association Best Books for Young Adults, American Library Association Popular Paperbacks for Young Readers, American Library Association Quick Picks for Young Adults, IRA Young Adult Choices, NCSS-CBC Notable Trade Book in the Field of Social Studies, and California Young Reader Medal.

Works
Amen, Moses Gardenia (1983)
The Stainless Steel Rule (1986)
Invincible Summer (1987)
 Looking for Home (1989)
Across the Grain (1990)
Relative Strangers (1993)
Signs of Life (1995)
 Avon Books American Dreams series – children's historical novels
 Into the Wind ( 1996)
 Song of the Sea (1996)
 Weather the storm (1996)
This trilogy by Ferris is set during the War of 1812. An American girl and a pirate captain fall in love.
All that Glitters (1996)
Love Among the Walnuts (1998)
Bad (1998)
Seven Seconds (1999)
Eight Seconds (2000)
Of Sound Mind (2001)
Once Upon a Marigold (2002)
Much Ado About Grubstake (2006)
Underground (2008)
Twice Upon a Marigold (2008)
Thrice Upon a Marigold (2013)
She was working on Quadruple Upon a Marigold, which was expected in 2015.

References

External links

 
 
 
 Us.macmillan.com

1939 births
American children's writers
American young adult novelists
American historical novelists
American women novelists
20th-century American novelists
21st-century American novelists
Writers from California
American women children's writers
20th-century American women writers
21st-century American women writers
Women writers of young adult literature
Women historical novelists
2015 deaths